Rip Hewes Stadium is a 10,000-seat stadium located in Dothan, Alabama.  It is primarily used as the home of the Dothan High School football and soccer team, as well as other sporting and community events. It formerly shared home field with Dothan High School and Northview High School.  Evangelist Billy Graham once held an evangelistic campaign event here during his second trip through Dothan.  His previous event was held at the First Baptist Church, Dothan.  Due to the overwhelming crowds at the First Baptist Church, his evangelistic campaign was held at Rip Hewes Stadium on his second trip to the area.  Although it was pouring rain, crowds poured into the stadium to hear the gospel message.

External links
 http://www3.dothan.org/rip_hewes_stadium.html

American football venues in Alabama
Buildings and structures in Dothan, Alabama
High school football venues in the United States
High school sports in Alabama
Sports in Dothan, Alabama